Ahn Sang-soo (hangul:안상수, hanja:安商守, born February 9, 1946, in Changwon)
is a South Korean politician. He was chairman of the Grand National Party, the precursor to the Saenuri Party.  He was the Mayor of Changwon from 2014 to 2018. He hopes to improve that city's bicycle-sharing plan.

Controversies
He mistook thermos flasks as North Korean artillery shells in a bombed-out house afflicted after the Bombardment of Yeonpyeong. This has stirred controversies in the National Assembly of South Korea.

References

External links
 Profile on city of Changwon website
  Official Website
  Copy of official website at Archive.org

Members of the National Assembly (South Korea)
Living people
1946 births
Seoul National University School of Law alumni
Mayors of places in South Korea
South Korean prosecutors